Matthew "Matt" McLeod (23 December 1938 – 3 July 1983) was an English professional rugby league footballer who played in the 1960s and 1970s He played at club level for Workington Town, Wakefield Trinity (Heritage № 742) and Whitehaven as a  or , i.e. number 8 or 10, or, 11 or 12, during the era of contested scrums.

Background
Matt McLeod was born in Whitehaven, Cumberland, England, and he died aged 44 in Royal Victoria Infirmary, Newcastle upon Tyne, Tyne and Wear.

Playing career

Championship final appearances
Matt McLeod played right-, i.e. number 12, in Wakefield Trinity's 17-10 victory over Hull Kingston Rovers in the Championship Final during the 1967-68 season at Headingley, Leeds on Saturday 4 May 1968.

Challenge Cup Final appearances
Matt McLeod played right-, i.e. number 12, in Wakefield Trinity's 10-11 defeat by Leeds in the 1968 Challenge Cup "Watersplash" Final during the 1967–68 season at Wembley Stadium, London on Saturday 11 May 1968, in front of a crowd of 87,100.

Club career
Matt McLeod made his début for Wakefield Trinity during January 1968, and he played his last match for Wakefield Trinity during the 1969–70 season.

References

External links
Search for "McLeod" at rugbyleagueproject.org
Search for "McLoud" at rugbyleagueproject.org
Search for "McCloud" at rugbyleagueproject.org
Search for "MacLeod" at rugbyleagueproject.org
Search for "MacLoud" at rugbyleagueproject.org
Search for "MacCloud" at rugbyleagueproject.org
(archived by web.archive.org) Workington and Hull KR triumph in the regions
Rugby Cup Final 1968

1938 births
1983 deaths
English rugby league players
Rugby league props
Rugby league second-rows
Rugby league players from Whitehaven
Wakefield Trinity players
Whitehaven R.L.F.C. players
Workington Town players